Quan Horn is a South African rugby union player for the  in the Currie Cup. His regular position is fullback.

Horn was named in the  side for the 2022 Currie Cup Premier Division.

References

South African rugby union players
Living people
Rugby union fullbacks
Golden Lions players
Lions (United Rugby Championship) players
2001 births
Rugby union players from the Western Cape